Pablo Augusto Ferrari (September 11, 1949) is an Argentinian mathematician, member of the Bernoulli Society, the Institute for Mathematical Statistics,  the Brazilian Academy of Sciences, and the International Statistical Institute. He is also co-principal investigator at the Brazilian research center NeuroMat. Ferrari investigates probabilistic models of microscopic phenomena and macroscopic counterpart. He is the son of the contemporary conceptual artist León Ferrari.

Biography 
Pablo Ferrari was born in 1949. He got a degree in mathematics from the University of Buenos Aires (UBA) in 1974 and PhD in Statistics from the University of Sao Paulo (USP) in 1982. Ferrari was Professor at the USP from 1978 to 2008 and a visiting professor at Rutgers, Paris, Rome, Santiago de Chile and Cambridge. He is a UBA Professor and Researcher of CONICET from 2009 and a member of the Group Probability of Buenos Aires. He received a Guggenheim Fellowship in 1999, the Consecration Award of the Academy of Exact, Physical and Natural Sciences in Buenos Aires in 2011 and was named a fellow of the International Statistical Institute in 2013.

References

Academic staff of the University of São Paulo
1949 births
Living people
Members of the Brazilian Academy of Sciences
Argentine mathematicians